Nicholas Maroney is an Australian Paralympian who competed in intellectual disability basketball at the 2000 Summer Paralympics. The International Paralympic Committee identified him as one of the top ten players in the world in the lead up to the 2000 Games.  The 2000 games are notable for this athlete because it was the first time this event had been competed for at the Paralympics.

See also
 Australia at the 2000 Summer Paralympics

References

Bibliography 

 

Paralympic competitors for Australia
Intellectual Disability category Paralympic competitors
Australian men's basketball players
Living people
Year of birth missing (living people)
Sportspeople with intellectual disability